Cape Fear Township, population 1,323, is one of thirteen townships in Chatham County, North Carolina. Cape Fear Township does not contain any municipalities within it, but does contain Moncure, a census designated place.

Geography
The Haw River and Cape Fear River form the western boundary of Cape Fear Township.  New Hope Creek, impounded as B. Everett Jordan Lake and tributary of the Haw River, forms the northern boundary.  Two tributaries of New Hope Creek include Weaver Creek and Little Beaver Creek.  Shaddox Creek, a tributary of the Haw River joins just above the Cape Fear River confluence.  Gulf Creek and Buckhorn Creek, tributaries of Cape Fear River drain the southeast part of the township.

References

Townships in Chatham County, North Carolina
Townships in North Carolina